Frank Bernard Avruch (May 21, 1928 – March 20, 2018) was an American television host who played Bozo the Clown on Boston television from 1959 to 1970. He played the first nationally syndicated version of the clown.

Early life
Avruch was born in Boston and grew up in Winthrop, Massachusetts. He was named best actor at Winthrop High School and acted in Summer stock theatre in Gloucester, Massachusetts. However, his mother objected to an acting career and he enrolled in Missouri School of Journalism. He later returned to Boston and in 1949 he graduated from the Boston University College of Communication with a bachelor’s degree in journalism.

His first broadcasting job came at WVOM. He then worked at WNEB in Worcester, Massachusetts before returning to Boston. In 1957 he married Betty F. Greenman. In 1959 they purchased a home in Newton Centre, Massachusetts. They had two sons.

Bozo the Clown
Avruch joined WHDH-TV in 1957 as an announcer. In 1959, WHDH purchased the rights to Bozo the Clown from Larry Harmon and Avruch won the role. In 1966, Harmon decided to replace all of the local versions of Bozo with a single nationally syndicated show and chose Avruch to serve as Bozo. Avruch taped 180 episodes of Bozo’s Big Top for national syndication. As Bozo, Avruch toured the world performing for UNICEF. He was given a United Nations Award for his work with children. During his time as Bozo, Avruch also interviewed entertainment figures for Dateline: Boston. In 1970, WHDH-TV cancelled Bozo in favor of a morning news broadcast.

Great Entertainment and "Man About Town"
Following Bozo’s cancellation, Avruch chose to remain in Boston rather than playing Bozo in another city. When WCVB-TV went on the air in 1972, he became the station’s booth announcer, performing on-air commercials and promos. In 1973 he began hosting Great Entertainment, WCVB-TV’s weekend film series. During its peak the series aired at 11:30 pm on Saturday and Sunday nights and during the afternoons on Sundays. Its popularity inspired WSBK-TV and WQTV to create similar programs – WSBK’s The Movie Loft hosted by Dana Hersey and WQTV’s Those Magnificent Talkies hosted by Earl Ziff. In 1974, Avruch began co-hosting WCVB-TV’s Sunday public affairs program, known by various names during its run, including, Sunday Open House, New England Sunday, Sunday Best, and Sunday. He also hosted a weekly cultural news report called "Man About Town". In 1986, Avruch suffered a mild heart attack. He returned to the air after only 17 days. In 1992, WCVB-TV cut Sunday from a weekly program to a monthly one. That December, finding it difficult to compete with cable networks, especially after Turner Broadcasting acquired the MGM library that WCVB-TV had long been using, the station canceled Great Entertainment. Avruch remained with the station as its announcer and an on-air personality for special events and occasional news stories. He retired from the station in 1995, but continued to appear on the stations’ various telethons and represented the station at various public events.

Later life and death
Following his retirement, Avruch launched his own website – Frank Avruch: Boston's Man About Town (www.bostonman.com), which, like the “Man About Town” segments he did for WCVB-TV news, provided information on special events,  hotels, restaurants, museums, and theaters in Boston. He also hosted a classic movie series at the Wang Center for the Performing Arts and the Coolidge Corner Theatre, did voice over work, and represented WCVB-TV at public functions. In 2007 he was inducted into the inaugural class of the Massachusetts Broadcasters Hall of Fame. The Avruchs spent their later years in Boston. Avruch died on March 20, 2018 in his Boston home of heart disease. He was 89 years old.

References

1928 births
2018 deaths
American television personalities
Male television personalities
Boston University College of Communication alumni
Bozo the Clown
Missouri School of Journalism alumni
People from Newton, Massachusetts
People from Winthrop, Massachusetts